The 2021 Frisco Football Classic was a college football bowl game played on December 23, 2021, in Frisco, Texas, with kickoff at 3:30 p.m. ET (2:30 p.m. CT local time), televised on ESPN. It was one of the 2021–22 bowl games concluding the 2021 FBS football season.

The NCAA approved the bowl game in order to accommodate all 83 bowl-eligible teams; otherwise, one bowl-eligible team would not have been selected for a bowl game. The added bowl game essentially served as a replacement of the canceled San Francisco Bowl.

Teams
The game features teams from the Group of Five conferences. This was the first time that North Texas and Miami University ever played each other.

North Texas Mean Green

North Texas, from Conference USA (C–USA), finished the regular season 6–6, 5–3 in conference play. The Mean Green won their season opener against Northwestern State, 44–14, but then lost the next six games, dropping to 1–6. North Texas then went on to win its next five games, including upset victories over UTEP and a 45–23 victory over then-undefeated #22 UTSA in the regular season finale, handing UTSA its first loss of the season.

Miami RedHawks

Miami, from the Mid-American Conference (MAC), finished the regular season 6–6, 5–3 in conference play. In the team's regular season finale, the RedHawks had a chance to play in the MAC Championship Game by defeating Kent State. Miami trailed 31–41 with 11:17 left in regulation, coming back to tie the game 41–41 to send it to overtime. Kent State went on offense first, scoring a touchdown and making the point after attempt. The RedHawks would score a touchdown and attempted a two-point conversion pass, but the pass was incomplete. Miami lost 47–48, sending Kent State to the conference championship game.

Game summary

Statistics

See also
2021 Frisco Bowl, played at the same venue two days prior

Notes

References

External links
Game statistics at statbroadcast.com

Frisco Football Classic
Miami RedHawks football bowl games
North Texas Mean Green football bowl games
2021 in sports in Texas
Frisco Football Classic